The 2011 Austrian Figure Skating Championships took place between 17 and 19 December 2010 at the Sportwelt NÖ, Eissporthalle in Sankt Pölten. Skaters competed in the disciplines of men's singles, ladies' singles, pair skating, and ice dancing on the senior level. The results were used to choose the Austrian teams to the 2011 World Championships and the 2011 European Championships.

Senior results

Men

Ladies

Pairs

Ice dancing

External links
 2011 Austrian Championships results

2011
2011 in figure skating
2010 in figure skating
Figure Skating Championships,2011
Figure Skating Championships,2011